Helen Boyce, (born Helen Boise; September 24, 1918 – February 27, 1997) was an American film actress of the 1940s.

Biography 
Born in Missouri, Boyce moved to Hollywood in the early 1940s to pursue a career in acting. Her first film role was uncredited, in the 1943 film Above Suspicion, starring Joan Crawford and Basil Rathbone. 1945 and 1946 were her biggest years, with her appearing in five films over the two-year period. Her biggest role during her short-lived career was the 1946 film Abilene Town, starring Randolph Scott and Lloyd Bridges. In 1947 and 1948 she had only three film appearances, only one of which was credited, that one being the 1947 film Hollywood Barn Dance. Her last appearance was uncredited, in the 1948 film Arch of Triumph. She retired afterwards, and settled in Burbank, California, where she was living at the time of her death on February 27, 1997.

Filmography

References

External links

1918 births
1997 deaths
American film actresses
Actresses from Missouri
20th-century American actresses